Cyclin-I is a protein that in humans is encoded by the CCNI gene.

The protein encoded by this gene belongs to the highly conserved cyclin family, whose members are characterized by a dramatic periodicity in protein abundance through the cell cycle. Cyclins function as regulators of CDK kinases. Different cyclins exhibit distinct expression and degradation patterns which contribute to the temporal coordination of each mitotic event. This cyclin shows the highest similarity with cyclin G. The transcript of this gene was found to be expressed constantly during cell cycle progression. The function of this cyclin has not yet been determined.

References

External links

Further reading

Cell cycle regulators